Mary Soronadi (born 15 August 1971) is a Nigerian handball player. She competed in the women's tournament at the 1992 Summer Olympics.

References

1971 births
Living people
Nigerian female handball players
Olympic handball players of Nigeria
Handball players at the 1992 Summer Olympics
Place of birth missing (living people)